The second season, titled level 2, of the Zatch Bell! anime series was directed by Tetsuji Nakamura and Yukio Kaizawa and produced by Toei Animation. Based on the manga series by Makoto Raiku, the season follows the Mamodo Zatch Bell and his human partner Kiyo Takamine as they stand against the devious Mamodo Zofis and a legion of past-generation Mamodo. The season adapts volumes 11 through 18 of the manga, and features several self-contained story arcs and an episode special.

Viz Media licensed the anime for the English dub, which aired on Cartoon Network's Toonami in the United States and on YTV's Bionix in Canada starting April 1, 2006. The season ran for twenty-seven episodes on Cartoon Network until the series’ cancellation at 77 on January 20, 2007, although YTV aired the entirety of the season, finishing on November 1, 2008. The episodes were collected into seventeen DVD compilations by Shogakukan and released between May 18, 2005, and June 21, 2006. The dubbed episodes of this season, along with the first season’s, were collected in a DVD box set by New Video Group and released on December 3, 2013.

Six pieces of theme music are used during the season: one opening theme and three closing themes in the Japanese episodes; two opening and one closing theme in the dubbed episodes. The opening theme in the English airing of the season is “Follow the Light,” excluding the first two episodes (51 and 52) in which "Zatch Bell! Theme” is used, with an instrumental version of the latter chosen as the closing theme throughout—the three themes were composed by Thorsten Laewe and Greg Prestopino.


Summary
A guileful Mamodo named Zofis has gathered a set of thousand-year-old stone tablets, including one Kiyo obtained beforehand, and resurrect the Mamodo trapped within them to fashion an army for his own deeds. Zofis also subverts the hearts of humans to partner them up with the Mamodo—he has even corrupted his own partner Koko into doing his bidding. Zatch and Kiyo witness Zofis’ machinations firsthand and attempt to hinder him, but he and Koko flee with their army. 

Dr. Riddles and Kido soon pinpoint Zofis to an ancient ruin in South America and send Kiyo and Zatch there to confront him. They are joined by Riddles and Kido themselves, along with Megumi and Tia, Folgore and Kanchomé, Sunbeam and Ponygon, and Li-en and Wonrei; all whom Riddles had rallied for the attack. Following an initial setback, the team raids Zofis' hideaway and defeats the first wave of thousand-year Mamodo, but an ambush by Zofis forces them to scatter. The divided team encounters stronger adversaries, and Riddles loses Kido in the midst of their battle. Sherry and Brago then arrive and engage Zofis in an effort to extricate Koko from his clutch.

Zatch and his allies reunite by the Stone of Moonlight, the source of Zofis’ powers, which is guarded by the thousand-year Mamodo Demolt whose sheer size and strength prove formidable for the protagonists. However, several of Zofis’ minions; Penny, Byonko, and the thousand-year Mamodo Laila; defect to Zatch and help him vanquish Demolt and destroy the stone. This weakens Zofis, giving Sherry and Brago the upper hand against him. Zofis finally capitulates and loosens his grip on Koko, who is then nursed back to health at a hospital. Content at the outcome, Sherry and Brago send Zofis back to the Mamodo world, while Zatch, Kiyo, their friends, and the liberated humans head home, yet Riddles senses that an even greater danger is imminent.

Episode list

Notes

References 
General
 
 
 
 
 

Specific

2004 Japanese television seasons
2005 Japanese television seasons
Season 2